The 1825 Costa Rican Head of State election was held on 20 May 1825 and was Costa Rica's first ever election for Head of State. In the election liberal Juan Mora Fernández was re-elected as Head of State, a position that he occupied provisionally by mandate of the Congress. The elections in this period were held in two levels, first voted by citizens exercising their public vote who thus chose the electors who would formally elect the president. The representation by region was; 11 for San José, 8 for Cartago, 8 for Heredia, 5 for Alajuela, 3 for Escazú, 2 for Ujarrás, 1 for Térraba and 1 for Bagaces. Mora received the vote of all provinces except Alajuela who voted unanimously for his rival Mariano Montealegre.

References

Elections in Costa Rica
1825 elections in Central America
1825 in Costa Rica